Woodside was a township that existed in Essex County, New Jersey, United States, from 1869 to 1871.  Woodside was incorporated as a township by an Act of the New Jersey Legislature on March 24, 1869, from portions of Belleville Township On April 5, 1871, almost two weeks after its second anniversary, the township was dissolved, and its territory was absorbed by Belleville and Newark. Woodside Station, which today would be near the intersection of Grafton Ave & Oraton St, was a stop on the Erie Lackawanna Railroad Newark Branch. Although the actual stop was further down Grafton Ave., directly across from the former Archbishop Walsh Homes. There was a small railroad green, snack bar & ticket station right next to the tracks. Passenger service was discontinued in 1966, although freight service, operated by Norfolk Southern Railroad, is still active and serves several local industries in the Newark area. It is now known as the Newark Industrial Track.

References

Populated places established in 1869
Geography of Essex County, New Jersey
Former townships in New Jersey
1869 establishments in New Jersey